Thiago Hernandez Alves (born May 22, 1982) is a retired Brazilian professional tennis player who competed mainly on the ITF Tour. His career-high singles ranking was World No. 88, achieved in July 2009.

Tennis career

In Grand Slams
He has made four Grand Slam main draw appearances, qualifying into the
U.S. Open in both 2006 and 2008, Roland Garros and Wimbledon in 2009. In 2006, he beat No. 359 Mariano Zabaleta in the first round before losing to No. 22 Fernando Verdasco in the 2nd round.

2007 Win Over Moya
At the 2007 Brasil Open, Alves, roared on by his home crowd, scored a famous victory over No. 4 seed and former French Open champion Carlos Moyà. However, he fell to Juan Mónaco in the second round

2008
Alves lost to Roger Federer in the second round of the US Open in three sets.

2009
In the first round of the Johannesburg, SA Tennis Open he lost heavily to Jo-Wilfried Tsonga. He also lost in the first round of the 2009 French Open to Jérémy Chardy.

At Wimbledon he played in the first round as a lucky loser and defeated Andrei Pavel. He faced 8th seed Gilles Simon in the second round and won the first set but went on to lose.

Career titles

Singles (7)

Doubles (3)

Runners-up

Singles (10)

Doubles (7)

External links
 
 
 

1982 births
Living people
Brazilian male tennis players
Sportspeople from Florianópolis
People from São José do Rio Preto
Tennis players at the 2007 Pan American Games
Pan American Games competitors for Brazil
20th-century Brazilian people
21st-century Brazilian people